Jean-André Venel (28 May 1740 – 9 March 1791) was a Swiss doctor and a pioneer in the field of orthopedics.

Venel was born in Morges, the son of a surgeon, Jean-François Venel.  He studied medicine in Montpellier, Paris and Strasbourg, and practised at Orbe and Yverdon; between 1770 and 1775 he was attached to the court of Count Stanisław Potocki. Nicholas Andry, in his work Orthopaedia, or the Art of Preventing and Correcting Deformities in Children (English edition 1741), had been the first to use the term "orthopaedia", but Venel is regarded by many as the "father of orthopaedics" because of his development of the practical applications. He for example established the world's first orthopaedics clinic in Orbe (VD).

Works
Nouveaux Secours Pour les Corps arrêtés Dans L’Oesophage; Ou Description De quatre Instrumens plus propres qu’aucun des anciens moyens à retirer ces Corps par la Bouche. (1769)
Essai sur la santé et sur l’éducation médicinale des filles destinées au mariage. (1776)

References

1740 births
1791 deaths
Swiss orthopedic surgeons
People from Morges